ELTA 1 HD or ELTA TV is a Bosnian commercial television channel based in Banja Luka. ELTA TV has started broadcasting their own experimental program on 12 May 2010 under the name "Elta televizija". On the first anniversary of broadcasting (2011) the program is broadcast in High definition 24 hours a day in the Serbian language. ELTA 1 HD is available via cable systems throughout the Bosnia and Herzegovina.

ELTA 1 HD Line-up
This television channel broadcasts a variety of programs such as entertainment and mosaic magazines, movies (full HD) and documentaries.

 FLAME - show bizz-entertainment magazine
 COVER magazin - entertainment magazine
 AQUANA TV - entertainment magazine
 Kafa u 5  - TV show on current issues and events in the RS entity and BiH.
 Trenutak za kulturni kutak - overview of cultural events in Banja Luka and the region.
 Pod istragom - (Under investigation) - news magazine with various topics

Foreign series

References

External links
 
 
 Communications Regulatory Agency of Bosnia and Herzegovina

Mass media in Banja Luka
Television stations in Bosnia and Herzegovina
Television channels in North Macedonia
Television channels and stations established in 2010